The Line of Saint Anne is a c.1500 oil on panel painting by Gerard David, now in the Museum of Fine Arts of Lyon, which acquired it in 1896. It shows the ancestors of Saint Anne, mother of the Virgin Mary, along the lines of a Tree of Jesse.

External links
http://www.mba-lyon.fr/mba/sections/fr/collections-musee/peintures/oeuvres-peintures/primitifs/lignee_sainte_anne?&startingReq=/sections/fr/collections-musee/peintures/oeuvres-peintures/&from_url=http%3A//www.mba-lyon.fr/mba/sections/fr/collections-musee/peintures/departement4598

1500s paintings
Paintings in the collection of the Museum of Fine Arts of Lyon
Paintings by Gerard David
Paintings of the Madonna and Child
Saint Anne